Andrew Hugessen (30 June 1926 – 5 December 2008) was a Canadian sailor. He competed in the Star event at the 1952 Summer Olympics.

References

External links
 

1926 births
2008 deaths
Canadian male sailors (sport)
Olympic sailors of Canada
Sailors at the 1952 Summer Olympics – Star
Sportspeople from Montreal